Sassi Punnu is a 1983 Indian Punjabi-language film, directed by Satish Bhakhri, starring Satish Kaul and Bhavana Bhatt. It is based on the folktale of Sassi Punnu.

Music 

The music is composed by Ravi for the playback singers Mohammad Rafi, Asha Bhosle, Usha Mangeshkar, Mahendra Kapoor, Muhammad Sadiq, Kuldeep Manak, and Anette. Hardev Dilgir, Babu Singh Maan, Munsif, Qamar Jalalabadi and Mahinder Kaailay penned the lyrics. The music vinyl record was released by HMV in 1982.

Track list

See also 
Sassui Punnhun

References 

Punjabi-language Indian films
Punjabi-language Pakistani films
Films set in Punjab, India
1980s Punjabi-language films
Films based on Indian folklore